The 2007 Seniors Torneo Godó was the second edition of the Seniors Torneo Godó and it took place from April 19–22, 2007.

Tie breaks were used for the first two sets of each match, which was the best of three sets. If the score was tied at one set all, a "champions tie break" (the first player to win at least 10 points or by a margin of two points) would be used.

Sergi Bruguera was the defending champion and successfully defended his title, by defeating Jordi Arrese 4–6, 6–1, [10–2] in an all-Spaniard final.

Draw
The list of players was confirmed in March 2007. The draw was announced on 12 April.

Blue Group:
  Sergi Bruguera
  Richard Krajicek
  John McEnroe
  Carl-Uwe Steeb
Red Group:
  Jordi Arrese
  Henri Leconte
  Thomas Muster
  Cédric Pioline

Withdrew before the tournament:
  Emilio Sánchez (replaced by Steeb)

Group stage

Group A

Krajicek had to withdraw before his match against Steeb due to an injury.

Group B

Final four

Third-place playoff

Final

References

External links
 Official Results Archive of the 2007 season (ATP)  (Barcelona appears in pages 6 and 7)

Seniors